Within the  Fijian nation, Matanivanua is the name of a Mataqali (clan). The Fijian word means "eye of the land". This clan is renowned as eloquent and articulate in speaking on behalf of the land and their chief.

When a chiefly presentation of a sevusevu is performed, only this clan can do it. They speak on behalf of the chief and all others in his or her chiefdom.

See also
Fijian traditions and ceremonies

Traditions and ceremonies